M'Chouneche District is a district of Biskra Province, Algeria.

Municipalities
The district has 1 municipality:
M'Chouneche

References

Districts of Biskra Province